Giovan Battista Nicolosi, D.D., was a Sicilian priest and geographer. Nicolosi proposed a new projection for the construction of the world map in two hemispheres, known today as the Nicolosi globular projection, in which the parallels and meridians are arcs of the circle and equidistant along the equator and central meridian.

Biography

Early life

Giovan Battista Nicolosi was born in Paternò, on October 14, 1610, of poor parents. He was the second child in a family of ten siblings.

In 1640 Nicolosi moved to Rome, where he devoted himself to the study of mathematics and geography and quickly gained favor with the city's most powerful families. In 1642, he published his Teorica del Globo Terrestre ("Theory of the Terrestrial Globe"), a small geographical treatise  in which he adopts the tripartite division of the subject into mathematical, physical, and political geography, usually credited to Varenius. Although in his unpublished works he showed leanings towards the new views of Copernicus, he does not here venture to break away from the Ptolemaic system, no doubt owing to his character as a devout son of the Church.

Career 

The Theory of the Terrestrial Globe brought Nicolosi to the attention of broader scientific circles and earned him the Chair in Geography at Sapienza University of Rome. In late 1645, Nicolosi travelled to Germany at the invitation of Ferdinand Maximilian, margrave of Baden, where he remained until 1647. In 1647 he returned to Rome, and was appointed chaplain at Santa Maria Maggiore. In 1652, possibly motivated by Nicolas Sanson's new collection of maps, the Sacred Congregation for the Propagation of the Faith (Propaganda Fide) hired Nicolosi to compose a new atlas. After twelve years of study and research, he published the Dell’Hercole e studio geografico, in two volumes with maps and directions for making maps and globes. The first volume was principally occupied with a detailed description of the countries of the world, while the second formed an atlas of  twenty-two newly devised maps — two of the hemispheres, and four devoted to each of the five continents. In this atlas Nicolosi was the first to employ the so-called polyconic or pseudo-perspective projection on a printed map. This projection technique was suggested in the eleventh century by the Persian mathematician al-Bīrūnī. Nicolosi reinvented al-Bīrūnī's projection as a modification of Fournier's first projection. It is unlikely Nicolosi knew of al-Bīrūnī's work, and Nicolosi's name is the one usually associated with the projection. This became a standard method of showing the two hemispheres of Earth during the nineteenth century after the equatorial stereographic projection popularized by Gerardus Mercator finally fell into disuse.

Nicolosi also undertook for Pope Alexander VII and the Emperor Leopold I the mapping of the States of the Church and the Kingdom of Naples, besides making five large maps for Prince Borghese. Nicolosi's last published work is Guida allo studio geografico ("Guide to geographic study"), a small treatise designed to supplement and explain the other two. He died in Rome on January 19, 1670.

Works 

 
 
 
 
 
 

There exists in the Biblioteca Casanatense a considerable collection of Nicolosi’s unpublished work. This includes a large chorographic map of all of Christendom, commissioned by Pope Alexander VII, as well as a full geographic description and map of the Kingdom of Naples, which was sent to Holy Roman Emperor Leopold I in 1654 and an important relation of his trip to Germany (Viagio di Germania in tante lettere al cardinale Rinaldo d’Este e Parentele della casa di Baden con le corone e principi di Europa).

Gallery of images

References

Notes

Bibliography

External links 
 
 

Writers from Sicily
17th-century geographers
17th-century male writers
17th-century Italian cartographers
1610 births
1670 deaths
Academic staff of the Sapienza University of Rome
People from Paternò
Italian geographers
Catholic clergy scientists